Plattsville is a census-designated place (CDP) in the towns of Easton and Fairfield, Fairfield County, Connecticut, United States. It is primarily in the town of Easton, with a portion extending south across the Mill River into Fairfield. The Merritt Parkway forms the southeast border of the CDP, and Connecticut Route 59 (Sport Hill Road in Easton and Easton Turnpike in Fairfield) runs north–south through it.

Plattsville was first listed as a CDP prior to the 2020 census.

References 

Census-designated places in Fairfield County, Connecticut
Census-designated places in Connecticut